1926 Finnish Figure Skating Championships were held in Helsinki on 21 February 1926.

The men's and women's single skating events were not contested.

Pair skating 

Source:

Girls' single skating 

Source:

Sources

References 

Finnish Figure Skating Championships
1926 in figure skating
1926 in Finnish sport
February 1926 sports events
1920s in Helsinki
Sports competitions in Helsinki